LaKeshia N. Myers (born May 21, 1984) is an American educator and politician.  She is a member of the Wisconsin State Assembly, representing the northwest corner of the city of Milwaukee.  She was elected to her first term in the Assembly in November 2018 after defeating seven-term incumbent representative Fred Kessler in the Democratic Party primary election.

Early life and education
Myers was born in Milwaukee, Wisconsin, and graduated from Rufus King High School in 2002. She received a Bachelor of Arts degree from Alcorn State University in 2006 (from 2005 to 2006 she was National Membership Director of College Democrats of America), a Master of Education from Strayer University in 2009, and a doctor of education from Argosy University in 2016. In addition to working as Director of Education for the Wisconsin Department of Corrections and a trainer of teachers at Milwaukee Public Schools, she has been a small business owner, a clerk for the United States House of Representatives, and a legislative aide for Wisconsin State Senator Lena Taylor. She is a member of Alpha Kappa Alpha sorority.

Assembly race
In 2012, after a drastic redistricting by the Republican-controlled legislature removed his home from the 12th and changed the racial complexion completely, Kessler (who had served in the Assembly on and off since 1961) faced a challenge in the Democratic primary from African-American newcomer Mario Hall, who was reported to be a school choice supporter with backing from pro-voucher organizations. Kessler (who had to move into the redrawn district) won with 71% of the vote, and faced no challenger in the November general election. Kessler was re-elected without opposition in 2014 and 2016.

In 2018, Myers (who has been active in various African-American and other civic organizations) announced her candidacy, saying that she ran because "neglect and starvation" had hurt Wisconsin's educational system, advocating that fewer people be re-imprisoned for minor probation and parole violations, and denouncing what she calls the district's economic decline. Kessler has been a frequent critic of Milwaukee County Executive Chris Abele on issues from privatization of Milwaukee public schools to the public subsidies which financed the Fiserv Forum; and the Leadership MKE political action fund (financed almost completely by Abele) reported spending over $57,000 in support of Myers' candidacy. In the primary she defeated the 78-year-old Kessler with 3,709 votes to his 2,545. Afterwards, she told the Associated Press, "I think the district made their voices clear with, it's time for us to cash in on that seat by having someone, a person of color, represent us in this district." (She is the only African-American woman in the Assembly from the Milwaukee area, and one of only two statewide.) She drew 17,428 votes in the general election, with only 274 write-in votes against her.

Electoral history

| colspan="6" style="text-align:center;background-color: #e9e9e9;"| Primary Election, August 14, 2018

| colspan="6" style="text-align:center;background-color: #e9e9e9;"| General Election, November 6, 2018

References

1984 births
Living people
Schoolteachers from Wisconsin
American women educators
Women state legislators in Wisconsin
African-American state legislators in Wisconsin
21st-century American politicians
African-American women in politics
Politicians from Milwaukee
Alcorn State University alumni
Argosy University alumni
Strayer University alumni
Democratic Party members of the Wisconsin State Assembly
Alpha Kappa Alpha members
21st-century American women politicians
Rufus King International High School alumni
21st-century African-American women
21st-century African-American politicians
20th-century African-American people
20th-century African-American women